, known before as Miki Kawashima, is a Japanese musical composer, singer-songwriter, lyricist under Being Inc. records.

Biography
In 1986, she debuted as Miki Kawashima with the single Silk no Kuchibiru under CBS Sony label. Three years, she debuted as Daria Kawashima with the single Shiny Day under the Zain Records label. Since joining the Being agency, Kawashima has composed and wrote several songs for artists like Zard and Deen. In 1992, she composed Moonlight Densetsu under the alias of Tetsuya Komuro, presumably inspired by the legendary songwriter of the same name. The song would later be used as an opening theme for the popular anime series Sailor Moon. Kawashima also became known as the vocalist and leader of the heavy metal band Feel So Bad. In 2003, she participated in the cover album The Hit Parade, covering Gedō's Hyun Hyun. It was produced by Tak Matsumoto from B'z. In 2016, she made her return as a solo artist with the digital release of her album Life Now.

Some of her music video clips are included in musicvideo DVD series 90s Being Rock Hits.

Discography
During her solo career as Daria Kawashima she released four singles, 2 studio, 1 digital and 1 compilation album.

Singles
Shiny Day (1991)
Don't Look Back (1991)
Get it On (1992)
Kanashiki Jiyuu no Hate ni (悲しき自由の果てに) (1992)

Studio albums
Believin' myself (1991)
Don't Look Back (1992)

Compilation album
complete of Kawashima Daria & FEEL SO BAD at the BEING studio (2003)

Digital album
LIFE=NOW (2016)

List of provided works as a lyricist

Sakurakko Club
Nani ga Nandemo

B.B.Queens
I remember you

Mi-ke
Moon na Kimochi wa Osenchi
Oh My Sweet Heart

Deen
Omoikiri Waratte
Eien wo Azuketekurete
Twelve
Mou Nakanaide

Band-Maid
Freezer
Don't Apply the Brake
Beauty and the Beast

List of provided works as a composer

Zard
Forever (Mou Sagasanai)
Ano Hohoemi wo Wasurenai de, Why Don't You Leave Me Alone, Ai wa Nemutteru, So Together (Hold Me)
Listen to Me (Yureru Omoi)
Stray Love
Take Me to Your Dream
Ready, Go!

Mi-ke
Ano Hi no I Love you

Yumiko Morishita
Tears
Somebody to Believe

Key West Club
Oaetsurae no Destiny
Silent Beach
Yume wa Majorika Senorita

Dali
Moonlight Densetsu

Wands
Kodoku he no Target (Toki no Tobira)
Don't Cry (Little Bit…)

T-Bolan
Heart of Gold

Baad
Dakishimetai Mou Ichido

Twinzer
DON'T FORGET YOU

Noriko Sakai
Here I am: Nakitai toki wa Nakeba ii

Azumi Uehara
Precious Days
Fly Away
Solitude
Mask
Endless World
One's Love, ask me, Deep Black, Clash! Clash! (Mushoku)
Never Free
Song for you
U&I (Ikitakuwanai Bokura)

Hayami Kishimoto
SAY GOOD BYE GLOOMY DAYS
Konya wa Kaeranai
Domino

Sparkling Point
South Point

The Tambourines
Star (My Back Pages)

Rina Aiuchi
Rainbow
NAVY BLUE
Rosemary
I can't stop my love for you♥
crystal pearl
Alright
Rock Steady
Playgirl
Neverending Winter
Thanx

Miki Matsuhashi
Itsumademo Ai wo Tsutumou

U-ka Saegusa in dB
It's for you
Hirari Yume Ichiya

Aiko Kitahara
Sayonara wo Ageta Hi ga Chikasugite (Piece of Love)
Love is blind?! (Message)
Sono Egao yo Eien ni

Aya Kamiki
ShooBidooBiBa, Because I close to you

NMB48
With my soul

List of provided works as both lyricist and composer

Zard
Koi Onna no Yūutsu, Onna de Itai (Good-bye My Loneliness)

Manish
Kirameku Toki ni Torawarete

Aiko Yanagihara
Don't let met down

Keiko Utoku
Kirei da to Ittekureta

T-Bolan
Kanashimi ga Itaiyo

Television appearances
Music Station:
Kanashiki Jiyuu no Hate ni
Baribari Saikyou No.1 (Feel so Bad)

External links
Official site (WebArchived) 
BeingGiza profile 
Daria Kawashima Twitter 
Feel so Bad Official Website 
Feel so Bad Official YouTube channel

References

1967 births
20th-century Japanese composers
20th-century Japanese women singers
20th-century Japanese singers
Being Inc. artists
Japanese women composers
Living people
20th-century women composers